San Francisco de Conchos   is a town and seat of the municipality of San Francisco de Conchos, in the northern Mexican state of Chihuahua. As of 2010, the town of San Francisco de Conchos had a population of 644, up from 596 as of 2005.

It was founded by Fray Alonso de la Oliva in 1604 and is the second oldest state of Chihuahua after Santa Barbara town receives its name in honor of its patron saint San Francisco de Asis and the people of the Conchos Indians.

History
From the mission and the convent of San Bartolome Valley (1570 and 1574) ranging from expeditions to the San Gregorio and Conchosrivers; same that give rise to the Franciscan Mission San Francisco de Conchos.

It is a young missionary who made these expeditions in search of indigenous villages to take the gospel to the inhabitants: Fray Alonso de la Oliva.

In moving towards the north he came to the source of the Ojo de San Antonio (now Ojo de Agua). By following the course of water that flowed through the shoal in the course of the millennium, he came to the confluence with the Rio Conchos. Before falling to the river waters they formed a small lake (Galeana) and that is where the Fray Alonso de la Oliva found the people of this area that they called Indians Coyamus. The mission followed visiting them and also helped by indigenous guides arrived to villages who would become Santa Cruz de Tepacolmes (Rosales), San Pablo (Meoqui), San Antonio (Julimes), San Lucas and San Pedro of Conchos on the banks of San Pedro. The founding of the mission would be these their villages farthest visit.

In 1604 he founded the Mission San Francisco de los Naturales del Rio de las Conchas, Franciscan mission.

The name in Castilian is due to the large number of small shells that had and there are still in bed. There also derives the name given to the inhabitants of its banks; Conchos river, Conchos Indians.

En this Mission San Francisco de Conchos had Indians of all nations fences (conchos, toboscos, chizos, coahuileños, sisimbles, Tarahumares tepehuanes, etc.), which at different times were brought to the mission to live in peace "under hood". In this same mission I get to be more than 4,000 Indians settled in the shoal eye, San Gregorio River, Florido River and the junction of the Conchos and Florido rivers.

References

Populated places in Chihuahua (state)
1604 establishments in New Spain
Populated places established in 1604